Gerald Paul Koocher (born March 13, 1947) is an American psychologist and past president of the American Psychological Association (APA). His interests include ethics, clinical child psychology and the study of scientific misconduct. He is Dean Emeritus Simmons University and also holds an academic appointment at Harvard Medical School. Koocher has over 300 publications including 16 books and has edited three scholarly journals including Ethics & Behavior which he founded. Koocher was implicated as an author of the so-called "torture memos" that allowed psychologists to participate in torture during interrogations in the Hoffman Report, an APA investigation into psychologists' involvement in interrogation at Guantanamo Bay, Cuba.

Biography

Career
Gerald Koocher earned an undergraduate degree in psychology from Boston University in 1968. He completed a master's degree (1970) and Ph.D. (1972) in clinical psychology from the University of Missouri. He worked full-time at Boston's Children's Hospital from 1971 to 2001, ultimately serving as chief of psychology. While at Boston Children's, he was an associate professor at Harvard Medical School. In June 2001 he became a professor and dean of the School of Nursing and Health Sciences at Simmons College in Boston. He later served as associate provost at Simmons, while continuing part-time service at Boston Children's Hospital and Harvard Medical School. He began serving as dean of the College of Science and Health at DePaul University on July 1, 2013. In September, 2018 he began serving as Provost and Senior Vice President for Academic Affairs at Quincy College.

Koocher is a fellow of the American Association for the Advancement of Science and was elected a fellow of thirteen APA divisions. He is the first person to be awarded five specialty diplomas from the American Board of Professional Psychology. In 2006 he became president of the APA. He had previously served on the APA's board of directors as Treasurer of APA for ten years. Koocher is the founder of the journal Ethics & Behavior and served as editor for 26 years. He is a past editor of the Journal of Pediatric Psychology and The Clinical Psychologist.

Children's Understanding of Death and Loss
Beginning in the early 1970s while still a graduate student, Koocher began studying children's understanding of death and loss.  He published several papers growing out of his doctoral dissertation research.

Family Coping with Chronic Illness

Koocher, G. P.  & O'Malley, J. E.  (1981). The Damocles Syndrome: Psychosocial Consequences of Surviving Childhood Cancer.  New York: McGraw Hill.
Williams. J. & Koocher, G. P.   (1999). Medical Crisis Counseling on a Pediatric Intensive Care Unit: Case Examples and Clinical Utility.  Journal of Clinical Psychology in Medical Settings, 6, 249-258.
Roberts, M.C., Koocher, G. P., Routh, D. K., & Willis, D. J.  (Eds.)  (1993).  Readings in Pediatric Psychology.  New York: Plenum.
Koocher, G. P. & La Greca, A. M. (Eds.) (2011) Emotional First Aid for Parents: Helping children and adolescents cope with predictable life crises.  New York: Oxford University Press.

Ethical Issues in Psychology and the Mental Health Professions
Koocher has developed an interest in the flip-side of the evidence based practice movement by studying discredited mental health theories, therapies, and assessment tools that have come into popular use.  He has trademarked the term "Psychoquackery" and is developing popular press materials for the public. His scholarly work on these topics include:

Koocher, G. P.  (Ed.) (1976). Children’s Rights and the Mental Health Professions.  New York: Wiley Interscience.
Koocher, G. P. & Keith-Spiegel, P. C.  (2008).  Ethics in Psychology and the Mental Health Professions: Standards and Cases (third edition).  New York: Oxford University Press.
W.  B. Johnson & Koocher, G. P. (Eds.) (2011). Ethical Conundrums, Quandaries and Predicaments n Mental Health Practice: A Casebook from the Files of Experts. New York: Oxford University Press.
Koocher, G. P. & Keith-Spiegel, P. C.  (2016).  Ethics in Psychology and the Mental Health Professions: Standards and Cases (fourth edition).  New York: Oxford University Press.

Psychoquackery: Discredited Treatments, Theories, and Tests
Norcross, J. C., Koocher, G. P., &  Garofalo, G. P.  (2006) Discredited Psychological Treatments and Tests: A Delphi Poll.  Professional Psychology: Research and Practice, 37, 515-522.  doi: 10.1037/0735-7028.37.5.515
Norcross, J. C., Koocher, G. P., Fala, N.C., &  Wexler, H.K. (2010) What Doesn’t Work? Expert Consensus on Discredited Treatments in the Addictions.  Journal of Addiction Medicine, 4, 174-180.  DOI: 10.1097/ADM.0b013e3181c5f9db.
Koocher, G. P., Norcross, J. C., McMann, M., & Stout, A. (2015).  Consensus on Discredited Assessment and Treatment Techniques used with Children and Adolescents. Journal of Clinical Child and Adolescent Psychology, 44, 722-729. DOI: 10.1080/15374416.2014.895941
Koocher, G. P. & Gill, E. (2016). Pet Me, Sniff Me, Squeeze Me: Quack Treatment for Autism. In R. M. Foxx & J. Mulick, J. (Eds.) Controversial Therapies for Developmental Disabilities (2nd Ed.). Philadelphia: Taylor & Francis, pp 347–356.

Research Ethics

Melton, G.B., Koocher, G. P., & Saks, M. J. (Eds.) (1983).  Children's Competence to Consent. New York: Plenum.
Koocher, G. P. (2002).  Using the CABLES Model to Assess and Minimize Risk in Research: Control Group Hazards.  Ethics & Behavior, 12, 75-86.
Keith-Spiegel, P. & Koocher, G.P. (2005).  The IRB Paradox: Could the Protectors Also Encourage Deceit?  Ethics & Behavior, 15,  339-350.
Keith-Spiegel, P., Koocher, G. P, Tabachnick, B. (2006).  What Scientists Want from Their Research Ethics Committees.  Journal of Empirical Research on Human Research Ethics, 1, 67-82.
Koocher, G. P. & Keith-Spiegel, P. (2010). Opinion: Peers nip misconduct in the bud.  Nature, 466, 438-440.  doi:10.1038/466438a
Koocher, G. P. (2012).  Colleagues as a Defense Against Bad Science.  The Physiologist, 55 (2), 52-56.
Koocher, G. P. (2014). Research Ethics and Private Harms. Journal of Interpersonal Violence. 29 (18) 2367- 3276, DOI: 10.1177/0886260514534986

Awards

1969 1970 United States Public Health Service Fellow, University of Missouri

1971 Psi Chi (Honorary in Psychology)

1977 Elected a Fellow of the American Psychological Association (12 Divisions)

1981 Jack D. Krasner Memorial Award, Division of Psychotherapy, American Psychological Association

1983 Distinguished Professional Contribution Award, Section on Clinical Child Psychology, American Psychological Association

1986 Distinguished Career Contribution Award, Massachusetts Psychological Association

1986 Michael Dinoff Memorial Lecturer, University of Alabama, Tuscaloosa, AL

1987 Elected to the Collegium of Distinguished Alumni, College of Liberal Arts, Boston University

1987 Distinguished Professional Contribution Award, Society of Pediatric Psychology

1987 Matthew Ryan Young Memorial Lecturer, University of Massachusetts Medical School, Worcester, MA

1988 Nicholas Hobbs Award for Distinguished Contributions to Children's Services, American Psychological Association, Division of Child, Youth and Family Services

1989 Elected a Fellow of the American association for the Advancement of Science

1988-1989 Linda Pollin Memorial Lecturer, Linda Pollin Foundation, Bethesda, MA

1992 American Psychological Association Award for Distinguished Professional Contributions to Public Service

1993 Elected to the National Academies of Practice; Distinguished Practitioner in Psychology

1993 Karl F. Heiser Presidential Award, American Psychological Association

1996 Distinguished Alumnus Award, University of Missouri, College of Arts and Sciences

1996 Robert Chin Memorial Award of the Society for the Psychological Study of Social Issues

2003 Florence Halpern Award for Distinguished Professional Contributions, Society of Clinical Psychology, American Psychological Association

2005 Distinguished Psychologist Award, Division of Psychotherapy, American Psychological Association

2005 Distinguished Career Contribution Award, Connecticut Psychological Association.

2010- National Institutes of Health, College of CSR Reviewers

2010 2010 Annual Innovation Award for Excellence in Human Research Protection, Health Improvement Institute

2011 Walter C. Randall Lecturer on Biomedical Ethics, American Physiological Society

2012 Asuncion Miteria Austria and John Robinson Distinguished Mentoring Award, Society for the Psychological Study of Ethnic Minority Issues (APA Division 45)

2015 American Board of Professional Psychology, recognition award for leadership, service, and mentoring
Editorial Service

1976 1988 Consulting Editor, Professional Psychology: Research and Practice 1994-2000

1977 Consulting Editor, Journal of Pediatric Psychology

1977 1994 Consulting Editor, Journal of Clinical Child Psychology

1982- Consulting Editor, Journal of Psychosocial Oncology

1982 1987 Editor, Journal of Pediatric Psychology

1985 1989 Consulting Editor, American Journal of Orthopsychiatry 2001-

1985 1999 Consulting Editor, Children and the Law series, University of Nebraska Press

1988-1995 Consulting Editor, Journal of Consulting and Clinical Psychology

1988-1990 Editor, The Clinical Psychologist

1989-1990 Editor, Clinical Psychology Bulletin

1990-2016 Editor, Ethics & Behavior

1992- Consulting Editor, Oxford University Press Series on Clinical Psychology

1994- Consulting Editor, Clinical Psychology: Science and Practice

1996-2000 Associate Editor, Encyclopedia of Psychology, APA and Oxford University Press

1998- Consulting Editor, Journal of Aggression, Maltreatment & Trauma

2000- Consulting Editor, Journal of Trauma Practice

2004-2006 Consulting Editor, Canadian Psychologist

2009- Consulting Editor, Forensic Psychology Unbound

Selected works
Gerald P. Koocher (Ed.). Children's Rights and the Mental Health Professions. Wiley, 1976. .
Patricia Keith-Spiegel, and Gerald P. Koocher. Ethics in Psychology: Professional Standards and Cases. Erlbaum, 1985. .
Gerald P. Koocher and Patricia Keith-Spiegel. Children, Ethics, and the Law: Professional Issues and Cases. University of Nebraska Press, 1990. .
Michael C. Roberts, Gerald P. Koocher, Donald K. Routh, Diane J. Willis (Eds.). Readings in Pediatric Psychology. Plenum Press, 1993. .
Gerald P. Koocher. Whistleblowing And Scientific Misconduct: A Special Issue of Ethics & Behavior. Lawrence Erlbaum Associates, 1993, .
Gerald P. Koocher. Ethics in Cyberspace. Lawrence Erlbaum Associates, 1996. .
Gerald P. Koocher, John C. Norcross and Sam S. Hill (Eds.). Psychologists' Desk Reference. Oxford University Press, 1998. .
Gerald P. Koocher (Ed.). Protection of Participants in Sensitive Social Research: A Special Issue of Ethics & Behavior. Lawrence Erlbaum Associates, 1998. .
Gerald P. Koocher. The Science And Politics of Recovered Memories: A Special Issue of Ethics & Behavior. Lawrence Erlbaum Associates, 1998. .
Steven N. Sparta and Gerald P. Koocher (Eds.). Forensic Mental Health Assessment of Children And Adolescents. Oxford University Press, 2006. .
 Gerald P. Koocher and Patricia Keith-Spiegel. Ethics in Psychology and the Mental Health Professions: Professional Standards and Cases. Oxford University Press, 2008. 
Kenneth S. Pope, Janet L. Sonne, Beverly Greene and Gerald P. Koocher. What Therapists Do Not Talk About and Why: Understanding Taboos That Hurt Us and Our Clients. American Psychological Association, 2006. .
Koocher, G. P. & La Greca, A. M. (Eds.) (2011) Emotional First Aid for Parents: Helping children and adolescents cope with predictable life crises.  New York: Oxford University Press.
 Gerald P. Koocher, John C. Norcross and Beverly A. Greene (Eds.). Psychologists' Desk Reference, 3rd Edition. Oxford University Press, 2013. .
 Gerald P. Koocher and Patricia Keith-Spiegel. Ethics in Psychology and the Mental Health Professions: Professional Standards and Cases, 4th Edition'. Oxford University Press, 2016.

References

External links
Official website

1947 births
Living people
Presidents of the American Psychological Association
DePaul University faculty
Simmons University faculty
Harvard Medical School faculty
Boston University College of Arts and Sciences alumni
University of Missouri alumni